Salem County Career and Technical High School is a four-year vocational public high school located in Pilesgrove Township, New Jersey, United States, that serves the vocational education needs of students in ninth through twelfth grades in Salem County, as part of the Salem County Vocational Technical Schools. The school is accredited by the Middle States Association of Colleges and Schools Commission on Elementary and Secondary Schools.

As of the 2021–22 school year, the school had an enrollment of 696 students and 45.5 classroom teachers (on an FTE basis), for a student–teacher ratio of 15.3:1.

Awards, recognition and rankings
In 2012, Schooldigger.com ranked the school 130th out of 381 public high schools statewide in its 2011 rankings (an increase of 99 positions from the 2010 ranking) which were based on the combined percentage of students classified as proficient or above proficient on the mathematics (82.0%) and language arts literacy (97.5%) components of the High School Proficiency Assessment (HSPA).

Athletics
The Salem County Career and Technical High School Chargers interscholastic athletics are overseen by the New Jersey State Interscholastic Athletic Association (NJSIAA), competing independently, not as a member of an athletic conference. With 313 students in grades 10-12, the school was classified by the NJSIAA for the 2019–20 school year as Group I for most athletic competition purposes, which included schools with an enrollment of 75 to 476 students in that grade range.

References

External links
Salem County Career and Technical High School
Salem County Vocational Technical Schools

School Data for the Salem County Vocational Technical Schools, National Center for Education Statistics

Pilesgrove Township, New Jersey
Public high schools in Salem County, New Jersey
Vocational schools in New Jersey